One Dollar Lawyer is a South Korean television series starring Namkoong Min and Kim Ji-eun. Its screenplay, written by Choi Su-jin and Choi Chang-hwan, won the Grand Prize at 2015 SBS Screenplay Contest. It aired on SBS TV from September 23, to November 11, 2022 and airing every Friday and Saturday at 22:00 for 12 episodes (KST).

Synopsis
The series depicts the story of a lawyer who has the best skills but only charges 1000 won as his attorney's fee.

Cast

Main
 Namkoong Min as Chun Ji-hoon, a legal hero with strong cost-effectiveness that can be met with a one thousand won bill. 
 Kim Ji-eun as Baek Ma-ri, the last presenter of the Judicial Research and Training Institute. 
 Choi Dae-hoon as Seo Min-hyuk, a royal prosecutor in the legal world who wants what he likes.
 Lee Deok-hwa as Baek Hyun-moo, an attorney who founded a large law firm, grandfather of Baek Ma-ri.
 Park Jin-woo as Sa Ma-jang, a clerk of a law firm.

Supporting

People around Chun Ji-hoon
 Gong Min-jeung as Na Ye-jin, a prosecutor with high lifestyle.
 Kim Ja-young as Jo Eul-rye, the owner of the building that Chun Ji-hoon is renting.

Baek law firm
 Ha Sung-kwang as Seo Young-joon, a lawyer from Baek Hyun-moo's law firm.
 Jo Yeon-hee as Oh Min-ah, Baek Ma-ri's mother.
 Lee Chung-ah as Lee Joo-young, a lawyer who excels in a large law firm full of justice.

Others
 Kim Cheol-yoon as Lee Myung-ho, Chun Ji-hoon's client who is guilty of 4 criminal thefts.
 Park Sung-joon as Kim Min-jae, Ji-hoon's client.
 Hwang Jung-min as Lee Young-ok, the wife of Sa Ma-jang's office manager.
 Kwon Hyuk-sung as Chun Ji-hoon's assistant, during his time as a prosecutor.

Extended
 Lee So-young as Lee Myung-ho's wife.
 Kim Hyung-mook as Chun Young-bae, security guard Gapjil residents. He is the managing director of Cha Myung Group.
 Han Dong-hee as Kim Soo-yeon, She is a 26-year-old emergency medicine physician and sister of Kim Min-jae. 
 Um Hyo-sup as Kim Chun-gil, Famous painter, 58 years old, currently missing from a lawsuit against netizens Everyone believed that Kim Min-jae killed and buried him in Yongho Mountain.
 Park Seon-ah as Yoo Hee-joo, Directed by Youngwan Gallery is 54 years old. He was the victim of the Pung Jin Dong murder case. on the day of the incident.
 Yoon Na-moo as Choi Ki-tae, Chairman of JQ Group, 3rd Generation Chaebol.
 Nam Myeong-ryeol as Kim Yun-seop, He is a former member of the Central Investigation Department of the Office of the Attorney General and the Attorney General, Chun Ji-hoon's Father.
 Jeon Jin-oh as Jo Woo-seok, The killer who claims to kill Lee Joo-young.
 Hyun Bong-sik as Hwang Geum-sik, Used car dealer.  
 Kim Min-sang as CEO of a used car dealer.
 Kwon Hyuk-beom as Cha Min-cheol, Chun Ji-hoon's new client and the real criminal who killed Lee Joo-young.
Joo Seok-tae as Choi Ki-seok, chairman of JQ Group.

Special appearances
 Lee Je-hoon as Top Star Lee Je-hoon
 Jung Moon-sung as Shin Joong-hoon

Production
The series planned and produced by the drama department of SBS known as Studio S. On August 18, 2022, photos of script reading were released by the production.

In September 20, the press conference was canceled as actor Namkoong Min tested positive for COVID-19 on the same day of the press conference.

Namkoong Min and Kim Ji-eun have previously worked in Doctor Prisoner. The two actors/actress also have previously worked with Park Jin-woo in The Veil.

On October 21, 2022, a special episode will be aired by the announcer Jang Sung-kyu takes on the role of MC, and also downgraded the episodes from 14 episodes to 12 instead.

Filming for the drama will end on November 3, 2022.

Original soundtrack

Part 1

Part 2

Part 3

Part 4

Part 5

Viewership

Awards and nominations

Notes

References

External links
  
 
 One Dollar Lawyer at Daum 
 

2022 South Korean television series debuts
2022 South Korean television series endings
Korean-language television shows
Seoul Broadcasting System television dramas
Television series by Studio S
South Korean legal television series